Eugene Ivanov may refer to:

 Yevgeny Ivanov (spy) (1926–1994), Soviet naval attaché and spy
 Eugene Ivanov (artist) (born 1966), Russian-Czech artist